ODTTF (Obfuscated OpenType) is an embedded font file type used in Microsoft's XML Paper Specification (XPS) and Office Open XML formats. The file type refers to an obfuscated subsetted font based on the fonts used in the original document.

The MIME type is Microsoft's own invention and has not been submitted to the IANA registry.

According to the source code of Okular (see function parseGUID() and method XpsFile::loadFontByName()), the first 32 bytes of the font file are obfuscated by XOR using the font file name (a GUID). The rest of the file is normal OpenType. The byte order of the GUID representation coincides with that of the .NET Framework.

References

Font formats